William Kyd (fl. 1430–1453) was a 15th-century English pirate active in South West England from the 1430s until the 1450s. He and others, such as John Mixtow, William Aleyn and Clays Stephen, acted under virtual immunity from the law for over two decades while under the protection of corrupt custom officials.

Biography
William Kyd first appears in a list of pirates published in 1431 as the master of the balinger La Trinite of Exmouth. The previous year, he and a number of other pirates active in the West Country seized a Breton ship off the coast of Guernsey. Two years later, he joined William Aleyn and several others in capturing four ships carrying provisions to Rouen.

In 1436, sailing into the harbour of Saint-Pol-de-Léon in Brittany with eight barges and balingers, he sailed off with the Seynt Nunne which was under safe-conduct by local authorities. He returned to Plymouth with the captured ship as well as goods belonging to a Thomas Horewoode valued at £100. Continuing his exploits during the next decade, one of Kyd's most notable accomplishments included the capture of the La Marie of London in 1448. Taking the Flanders-bound ship off the coast of Queenborough in the Thames, he quickly sailed the ship to the Isle of Wight where he sold his prize.

In November 1453, in perhaps the biggest prize of his career, he captured The Marie of St. Andrews. When he brought the ship back with him to Exmouth, his prize was noticed by a Scottish knight Sir William de Kanete (or Kennedy). Kanete left to see Thomas Gille (or Gylle), the controller of customs of Exeter and Dartmouth, and pretended to be the brother of the Bishop of St. Andrews and owner of The Marie. He and Gille then conspired to obtain a commission for the delivery of the ship in which Gille would get a share of the goods on board. Issuing a complaint with local authorities, a commission was granted to Sir William Bourghchier de FitzWaryn, Nicholas Aysheton, Sir Philip Courtenay, Sir John Denham, James Chudley, Nicholas Radford and Thomas Gylle on 3 July. Gille, along with James Chudley and Nicholas Radford, proceeded to Exeter where, after testimony by the mayor John Germyn and several others, they officially seized the ship "of Wm. Kenete de Scocia militis" on 10 August and delivered the goods on board to Kenete.

References

Further reading
Born, Anne. A History of Kingsbridge and Salcombe. Chichester, UK: Phillimore, 1986.
Gardiener, D.A., ed. A Calendar of Early Chancery Proceedings Relating to West Country Shipping, 1388–1493. Devon and Cornwall Record Society, 1976.

English pirates
People from Exmouth
15th-century English people
1430 births
1453 deaths